Větřní is a town in Český Krumlov District in the South Bohemian Region of the Czech Republic. It has about 3,800 inhabitants.

Administrative parts
Villages of Dobrné, Hašlovice, Lužná, Nahořany, Němče, Zátoň and Zátoňské Dvory are administrative parts of Větřní.

Geography
It is situated on the left bank of the Vltava river. It lies in the Bohemian Forest Foothills.

History
The first written mention of Větřní is from 1347. The oldest part is the village of Němče, first mentioned in 1293. Větřní began to rapidly grow from 1870, when a paper mill was established. 

In 2017, Větřní obtained the town status.

Economy
In Větřní there is a paper mill which is one of the major paper producents in the Czech Republic. It is located near the Vltava.

Sights
The oldest building is the Church of Saint John the Baptist in Zátoň. It was built in the late Gothic style in the 1490s. The second notable building is the Church of Saint John of Nepomuk, a modern church from 1936–1938.

Twin towns – sister cities

Větřní is twinned with:
 Lotzwil, Switzerland

References

External links

Cities and towns in the Czech Republic
Populated places in Český Krumlov District
Romani communities in the Czech Republic